Josep Seguer Sans (6 May 1923 – 1 January 2014) was a Spanish football defender and manager.

Playing career
Born in Parets del Vallès, Barcelona, Catalonia, Seguer played 14 La Liga seasons with FC Barcelona, becoming a senior in 1942 and being immediately loaned to neighbours EC Granollers. During his spell with his main club he appeared in 470 games all competitions comprised, scoring 133 goals and being part of the Cinc Copes (Five Cups) squads, dubbed as such due to the five titles won during the 1952–53 campaign, including the domestic double.

Seguer won four caps for Spain, all in 1952. He made his debut on 1 June in a 6–0 friendly win against the Republic of Ireland, in Madrid. He closed out his career in 1961 at 38 after player-coach spells with Real Betis and CE Manresa, the latter side in his native region.

Coaching career
In 1961, Seguer became a full-time manager, his first job being with the amateur teams of Barcelona. For the following two decades he worked at every level of Spanish football, coaching professionally with Betis, UE Lleida, Barcelona, FC Barcelona B and Terrassa FC.

With the Blaugranas main squad, Seguer acted as caretaker manager between Salvador Artigas and English Vic Buckingham, being in charge for 13 official matches and winning six including his last, 1–0 at home over Real Madrid on 28 December 1969.

Death
Seguer died on 1 January 2014 in Reus, Province of Tarragona. He was 90 years old.

HonoursBarcelonaLa Liga: 1944–45, 1947–48, 1948–49, 1951–52, 1952–53
Copa del Generalísimo: 1951, 1952, 1952–53
Copa Eva Duarte: 1945, 1948, 1952, 1953
Latin Cup: 1949, 1952Betis'
Segunda División: 1957–58

References

External links

1923 births
2014 deaths
People from Vallès Oriental
Sportspeople from the Province of Barcelona
Spanish footballers
Footballers from Catalonia
Association football defenders
La Liga players
Segunda División players
FC Barcelona players
Real Betis players
CE Manresa players
Spain international footballers
Spanish football managers
La Liga managers
Segunda División managers
Real Betis managers
CE Manresa managers
UE Lleida managers
Terrassa FC managers
FC Barcelona managers
CD Condal managers
FC Barcelona Atlètic managers
CF Badalona managers
Villarreal CF managers
UE Figueres managers
CF Reus Deportiu managers